Magnolia Manor is a historic house on Apple Blossom Drive in Arkadelphia, Arkansas.  The two story wood-frame house was built in 1854–57, and is a fine local example of Greek Revival and some Italianate styling.  The house features corner pilasters, a broad eave with brackets, and a main entry on its eastern facade sheltered by a single-story porch with deck above.  A secondary entry on the south side is similarly styled.  The house was built by a South Carolina plantation owner, and has been owned by two state senators, Fletcher McElhannon and Olen Hendrix.  The manor's lands once extended all the way to Arkansas Highway 51.

See also
National Register of Historic Places listings in Clark County, Arkansas

References

Houses on the National Register of Historic Places in Arkansas
Greek Revival houses in Arkansas
Houses completed in 1854
Houses in Arkadelphia, Arkansas
National Register of Historic Places in Clark County, Arkansas